Panchrysia aurea is a moth of the family Noctuidae. It is found in southern Europe and western and central Asia. The range extends from Portugal, east to Tian Shan, the Altai and the north-western Himalayas. In central Europe, it is found in the southern Alps, lower Austria and the mountains on the Balkan Peninsula.

The wingspan is 40–44 mm. The ground colour of the forewings is golden yellow, sprinkled with reddish. The submarginal area ranges from violet brown to golden brown. The basal area ranges from violet brown to orange brown. The hindwings are uniform light yellowish grey to grey brown. There are two generations per year with adults on wing from May to June and from July to September.

The larvae feed on the leaves of Thalictrum species. Full-grown larvae are white. The species overwinters in the larval stage.

References

Further reading
 Walter Forster, Theodor A. Wohlfahrt: Die Schmetterlinge Mitteleuropas, Band IV, Eulen. Franckh’sche Verlagshandlung, Stuttgart 1971 
 Barry Goater, László Ronkay und Michael Fibiger: Catocalinae & Plusiinae Noctuidae Europaeae, Volume 10., Sorø 2003

External links

nic.funet.fi Taxonomy
Lepiforum.de
Pathpiva.fr

Moths described in 1803
Moths of Europe
Moths of Asia
Plusiini
Taxa named by Jacob Hübner